

Eardred was a medieval Bishop of Dunwich.

Eardred was consecrated sometime before 716 and died after that date.

References

External links
 

Bishops of Dunwich (ancient)